The 1992 SCCA Pro Racing World Challenge was the third running of the Sports Car Club of America's World Challenge series. It was the first not to be sponsored by Escort radar detectors. The series would not receive another corporate sponsor until its acquisition by SpeedVision in 1999. It included a 24-hour race at Mosport Park. It would be the final year with four or more groups until 1996. The season would also mark the end of the endurance racing the series was founded upon, gradually phased out until by 1999 its endurance races were replaced with one-hour sprints. The classes were changed from World Challenge, Super Production, and Super Sport to A, B, C, and D.

Results

References

GT World Challenge America